Amahl and the Night Visitors is an opera in one act by Gian Carlo Menotti with an original English libretto by the composer. It was commissioned by NBC and first performed by the NBC Opera Theatre on December 24, 1951, in New York City at NBC Studio 8H in Rockefeller Center, where it was broadcast live on television from that venue as the debut production of the Hallmark Hall of Fame. It was the first opera specifically composed for television in the United States.

Composition history
Menotti was commissioned by Peter Herman Adler, director of NBC's new opera programming, to write the first opera for television. The composer had trouble settling on a subject for the opera, but took his inspiration from Hieronymus Bosch's The Adoration of the Magi hanging in the Metropolitan Museum of Art in New York City.

As the airdate neared, Menotti had yet to finish the score. The singers had little time to rehearse, and received the final passages of the score just days before the broadcast. The composer's partner Samuel Barber was brought in to complete the orchestrations. After the dress rehearsal, NBC Symphony conductor Arturo Toscanini told Menotti, "This is the best you've ever done."

Menotti distinctly wanted Amahl to be performed by a boy. In the "Production Notes" contained in the piano-vocal score he wrote: "It is the express wish of the composer that the role of Amahl should always be performed by a boy. Neither the musical nor the dramatic concept of the opera permits the substitution of a woman costumed as a child."

Genesis

The booklet with the original cast recording contains the following anecdote:

This is an opera for children because it tries to recapture my own childhood. You see, when I was a child I lived in Italy, and in Italy we have no Santa Claus. I suppose that Santa Claus is much too busy with American children to be able to handle Italian children as well. Our gifts were brought to us by the Three Kings, instead.
I actually never met the Three Kings—it didn't matter how hard my little brother and I tried to keep awake at night to catch a glimpse of the Three Royal Visitors, we would always fall asleep just before they arrived. But I do remember hearing them. I remember the weird cadence of their song in the dark distance; I remember the brittle sound of the camel's hooves crushing the frozen snow; and I remember the mysterious tinkling of their silver bridles.

My favorite king was King Melchior, because he was the oldest and had a long white beard. My brother's favorite was King Kaspar. He insisted that this king was a little crazy and quite deaf. I don't know why he was so positive about his being deaf. I suspect it was because dear King Kaspar never brought him all the gifts he requested. He was also rather puzzled by the fact that King Kaspar carried the myrrh, which appeared to him as a rather eccentric gift, for he never quite understood what the word meant.

To these Three Kings I mainly owe the happy Christmas seasons of my childhood and I should have remained very grateful to them. Instead, I came to America and soon forgot all about them, for here at Christmas time one sees so many Santa Clauses scattered all over town. Then there is the big Christmas tree in Rockefeller Plaza, the elaborate toy windows on Fifth Avenue, the one-hundred-voice choir in Grand Central Station, the innumerable Christmas carols on radio and television—and all these things made me forget the three dear old Kings of my old childhood.

But in 1951 I found myself in serious difficulty. I had been commissioned by the National Broadcasting Company to write an opera for television, with Christmas as deadline, and I simply didn't have one idea in my head. One November afternoon as I was walking rather gloomily through the rooms of the Metropolitan Museum, I chanced to stop in front of the Adoration of the Kings by Hieronymus Bosch, and as I was looking at it, suddenly I heard again, coming from the distant blue hills, the weird song of the Three Kings. I then realized they had come back to me and had brought me a gift.

I am often asked how I went about writing an opera for television, and what are the specific problems that I had to face in planning a work for such a medium. I must confess that in writing  "Amahl and the Night Visitors," I hardly thought of television at all. As a matter of fact, all my operas are originally conceived for an ideal stage which has no equivalent in reality, and I believe that such is the case with most dramatic authors. —Gian-Carlo Menotti

Premiere
Menotti wrote Amahl with the stage in mind, even though it was intended for broadcast. "On television you're lucky if they ever repeat anything. Writing an opera is a big effort and to give it away for one performance is stupid." The composer appeared on-screen in the premiere to introduce the opera and give the background of the events leading up to its composition. He also brought out director Kirk Browning and conductor Thomas Schippers to thank them on-screen.

Amahl was seen on 35 NBC affiliates coast to coast, the largest network hookup for an opera broadcast to that date. An estimated five million people saw the live broadcast, the largest audience ever to see a televised opera.

Performance history

1951–1962
For its first three telecasts, the program had been presented in black-and-white (there were two presentations of it in 1952, one on Easter and one during the Christmas season), but beginning in 1953, it was telecast in color. Because it was an opera, and commercial network television executives had increasingly little confidence in presenting opera on television, it later began to be scheduled, with rare exceptions, as an afternoon television program, rather than shown in prime time as had been done in its first few telecasts. According to The New Kobbe's Complete Opera Book, the first stage performance was presented at Indiana University Bloomington, on February 21, 1952, with conductor Ernest Hoffman. The opera's second performance was in Boston on December 18 and 19, 1952. It was presented by the Opera Club at the Agassiz Theatre of Radcliffe College, under the direction of Thomas H. Phillips for the Longy School of Music. James Hercules Sutton, 9, soloist for Alfred Nash Patterson at the Church of the Advent, played Amahl; Claire Smith played the mother; Walter Lambert, Paul Johnson and Hermann Gantt played the three kings.

1963–1966

For years, Amahl was presented live, but in 1963 it was videotaped by NBC with conductor Herbert Grossman and an all-new cast featuring Kurt Yaghjian as Amahl, Martha King as the Mother, and John McCollum, Willis Patterson, and Richard Cross as the Three Kings. This was the first television production of "Amahl" in which the role of King Balthazar was sung by a real African-American. Earlier productions, including the 1951 original version, had had a white man in blackface singing the role. When Menotti found out that NBC had scheduled the taping on a date when he was out of the country, he tried to get the date changed. The network refused and recorded the 1963 performance without the composer's presence or participation, telecasting it in December 1963, and twice more after that — in 1964 and 1965. Menotti never approved of the 1963 production, and in May 1966 when the rights to future broadcasts reverted to him, the composer refused to allow it to be shown again. Because of this, Amahl was not shown on television at all between 1966 and 1978.

1978
In 1978, a new production starring Teresa Stratas as Amahl's mother, Robert Sapolsky as Amahl, and Willard White, Giorgio Tozzi and Nico Castel as the Three Kings was filmed by NBC, partly on location in the Holy Land. As was the norm for filmed opera, the music was pre-recorded and the singers mimed their performances to the playback. It did not, however, become an annual tradition the way the 1951 and 1963 versions had.

BBC productions
The BBC made several productions of Amahl and the Night Visitors in the 1950s. The first performance was broadcast on December 20, 1953, with Charles Vignoles as Amahl, and Gladys Whitred as his mother. The Three Kings were sung by John Lewis (Kaspar), Scott Joynt (Balthasar), and John Cameron (Melchior). Edric Connor was the Page and Josephine Gordon was the dancer. The opera was produced by Christian Simpson and the conductor was Stanford Robinson.
This performance was so successful that it was repeated on Christmas Eve 1954 with substantially the same cast apart from the Page sung by John Carvalho and the dancer, Betty Ferrier. 
Both performances were broadcast live. A telerecording of the 1954 performance was broadcast on Christmas Eve 1956 but this recording seems to have been discarded.
An audio recording of the 1954 performance exists in private hands.

Further performances followed in subsequent years. The 1955 performance was also produced by Christian Simpson, starring Malcolm Day as Amahl, with Gladys Whitred as Amahl's mother. Music was provided by the Sinfonia of London. It appears that this performance was also broadcast live. It was either not recorded or the recording was discarded. It does not exist in the BBC Archives. 
The second production was broadcast on December 24, 1959. This version exists as a 35 mm telerecording in the BBC Archives. This version was again produced by Christian Simpson and starred Christopher Nicholls as Amahl and Elsie Morison as Amahl's mother. This time music was provided by the Royal Philharmonic Orchestra.

1957 Australian TV version
A version was broadcast on ABC on Australian television in 1957. It was aired live in Melbourne on 18 December 1957, and was kinescoped to be shown in Sydney on Christmas Day. It is not known if the kinescope recording still exists.

Roles

Synopsis
Place: Near Bethlehem.
Time: The first century, just after the birth of Christ

Amahl, a disabled boy who can walk only with a crutch, has a problem with telling tall tales. He is sitting outside playing his shepherd's pipe when his mother calls for him ("Amahl! Amahl!"). After much persuasion, he enters the house but his mother does not believe him when he tells her there is an amazing star "as big as a window" outside over their roof ("O Mother You Should Go Out and See"; "Stop Bothering Me!").

Later that night, Amahl's mother weeps, praying that Amahl not become a beggar ("Don't Cry Mother Dear"). After bedtime ("From Far Away We Come"), there is a knock at the door and the mother tells Amahl to go see who it is ("Amahl ... Yes Mother!"). He is amazed when he sees three splendidly dressed kings (the Magi). At first the mother does not believe Amahl, but when she goes to the door to see for herself, she is stunned. The Three Kings tell the mother and Amahl they are on a long journey to give gifts to a wondrous Child and they would like to rest at their house, to which the mother agrees ("Good Evening!"; "Come In!"), saying that all she can offer is "a cold fireplace and a bed of straw". The mother goes to fetch firewood, and Amahl seizes the opportunity to speak with the kings. King Balthazar answers Amahl's questions about his life as a king and asks what Amahl does. Amahl responds that he was once a shepherd, but his mother had to sell his sheep. Now, he and his mother will have to go begging. Amahl then talks with King Kaspar, who is childlike, eccentric, and a bit deaf. Kaspar shows Amahl his box of magic stones, beads, and licorice, and offers Amahl some of the candy ("Are You a Real King?"; "This is My Box"). The mother returns ("Amahl, I Told You Not to Be a Nuisance!"). He defends himself, saying "They kept asking me questions," when of course it has in fact been Amahl asking the kings questions. Amahl is told to go fetch the neighbors ("All These Beautiful Things"; "Have You Seen a Child?") so the kings may be fed and entertained properly ("Shepherds! Shepherds!"; "Emily! Emily"; "Olives and Quinces"; "Dance of the Shepherds").

After the neighbors have left and the kings are resting, the mother attempts to steal for her son some of the kings' gold that was meant for the Christ Child ("All That Gold"). She is thwarted by the kings' page ("Thief! Thief!"). When Amahl wakes to find the page grabbing his mother, he attacks him ("Don't You Dare!"). Seeing Amahl's defense of his mother and understanding the motives for the attempted theft, King Melchior says she may keep the gold as the Holy Child will not need earthly power or wealth to build his kingdom ("Oh, Woman, You Can Keep That Gold"). The mother says she has waited all her life for such a king and asks the kings to take back the gold. She wishes to send a gift but has nothing to send. Amahl, too, has nothing to give the Child except his crutch ("Oh, No, Wait"). When he offers it to the kings, his leg is miraculously healed ("I Walk, Mother"). With permission from his mother, he leaves with the kings to see the Child and give his crutch in thanks for being healed.

Recordings
For several years it was assumed that the film (kinescope) of the original telecast had been lost, but a copy was found, transferred to video, and is now available at The Paley Center for Media (formerly The Museum of Television & Radio) and online at the Museum of Broadcast Communications.

The original 1951 telecast has never been rebroadcast, although bootleg recordings have been made. A kinescope of the 1955 broadcast starring Bill McIver as Amahl was digitized in 2007 and is available commercially on DVD. The 1955 and 1978 productions are the only ones released on video. Cast recordings of both the 1951 and the 1963 productions were released on LP by RCA Victor, and the 1951 cast recording was reissued on compact disc in 1987. The 1963 recording of Amahl was the first recording of the opera made in stereo.

Legacy
Amahl and the Night Visitors was the first network television Christmas special to become an annual tradition. There had already been several television productions of Charles Dickens' A Christmas Carol since about 1947, but they had not been shown annually or presented by the same television network, with the same general technical staff, as Amahl was. Until 1963, Amahl was nearly always presented with many of the same singers and production staff. From 1951 until 1966 it was presented every year on NBC (which commissioned Menotti to write it) on or around Christmas Eve, as an episode of an existing anthology series, such as The Alcoa Hour, NBC Television Opera, or the Hallmark Hall of Fame. The 1978 production of Amahl also premiered on NBC, before it went to cable television in the early 1980s.

See also
 List of Christmas operas

References

Notes

Sources
Barnes, Jennifer (2003), Television Opera: The Fall of Opera Commissioned for Television,  Boydell Press,

External links
 Amahl and the Night Visitors - Premier Broadcast on NBC (1951) on archive.org
Video: Performed by Milwaukee Opera Theatre

1951 operas
Children's operas
English-language operas
Christmas operas
One-act operas
Operas
Operas by Gian Carlo Menotti
Operas for television
Peabody Award-winning broadcasts
Musical television specials
1950s American television specials
1960s American television specials
1970s American television specials
1951 television specials
Hallmark Hall of Fame episodes
American Christmas television specials